David R. Watson is a bowyer currently living in Austin, Texas.
He has composed music for the Ultima series, including "Stones". Watson is a fencing master, a composer, and musician; and has a varied career of video game support including level designer in X-COM: Apocalypse, lead mission analyst in Grand Theft Auto: San Andreas, and music composer in Ultima.

Watson is also known by his Ultima alter ego, Iolo. His late wife,  Kathleen Jones, was also an Ultima character, Gwenno, Iolo's in-game wife.

Games credited
Ultima V: Warriors of Destiny (1988), Origin Systems (first appearance of his song "Stones")
Ultima VI: The False Prophet (1990), Origin Systems
Ultima VII: The Black Gate (1992), Origin Systems
Ultima VII Part Two: Serpent Isle (1993), Origin Systems
Ultima VII: The Silver Seed (1993), Electronic Arts
Stonekeep (1995), Interplay Productions
You Don't Know Jack: Volume 3 (1997), Sierra On-Line
You Don't Know Jack: Television (1997), Berkeley Systems
X-COM: Apocalypse (1997), MicroProse
You Don't Know Jack: Volume 4 - The Ride (1998), Sierra On-Line

Books
Iolo's First Book of Crossbows

References

External links
 New World Arbalest, David's Bows via Internet Archive
 David R. Watson at MobyGames
 David R. Watson at OverClocked ReMix

Year of birth missing (living people)
American video game designers
Bowyers
Living people
Origin Systems people
Ultima (series)
Video game composers